College Lake may refer to:

 College Lake nature reserve, Buckinghamshire
 College Lake, Cornwall
 College Lake, Nova Scotia